Spring City may refer to the name of several places, such as:

Spring City, Abaco, in the Bahamas
Spring City, Missouri
Spring City, Pennsylvania
Spring City, Tennessee
Spring City, Utah